Cyclobacterium caenipelagi  is a Gram-negative and aerobic bacterium from the genus of Cyclobacterium which has been isolated from tidal flat sediments in Korea.

References

External links
Type strain of Cyclobacterium caenipelagi at BacDive -  the Bacterial Diversity Metadatabase

Cytophagia
Bacteria described in 2013